Triplett is an unincorporated community located in Rowan County, Kentucky, United States.

References

Unincorporated communities in Rowan County, Kentucky
Unincorporated communities in Kentucky